Viktor Pavlovich Kostyuchenok (born 7 June 1979) is a Belarusian former professional ice hockey defenceman and currently an assistant coach for HC Spartak Moscow of the Kontinental Hockey League (KHL). During a playing career that lasted from 1995 until 2014 he played for multiple teams across Europe.

Playing career
He began playing professionally for Yunost Minsk in the Eastern European Hockey League in 1995. He spent 2000–01 and 2001–02 with HC Brest in the French league. He rejoined Minsky for another three seasons before playing for Lada Togliatti of the Russian Super League in 2006–07. He played for Minsk again the next season, and then joined Amur Khabarovsk in 2008 before HC Spartak Moscow.

International
Kostyuchenok was selected for the Belarus national men's ice hockey team in the 2010 Winter Olympics. He also participated at the 2010 IIHF World Championship as a member of the Belarus National men's ice hockey team.  He previously represented Belarus in the 2005, 2006, 2007, 2008, and 2009 Ice Hockey World Championships.

Career statistics

Regular season and playoffs

International

References

External links

1979 births
Living people
Amur Khabarovsk players
Avtomobilist Yekaterinburg players
Belarusian ice hockey defencemen
Brest Albatros Hockey players
Expatriate ice hockey players in Russia
HC Dinamo Minsk players
HC Lada Togliatti players
HC Spartak Moscow players
Ice hockey players at the 2010 Winter Olympics
Olympic ice hockey players of Belarus
Ice hockey people from Minsk
Yunost Minsk players
Belarusian expatriate sportspeople in France